This article is about the particular significance of the year 1800 to Wales and its people.

Incumbents

Lord Lieutenant of Anglesey – Henry Paget 
Lord Lieutenant of Brecknockshire and Monmouthshire – Henry Somerset, 5th Duke of Beaufort
Lord Lieutenant of Caernarvonshire – Thomas Bulkeley, 7th Viscount Bulkeley
Lord Lieutenant of Cardiganshire – Wilmot Vaughan, 1st Earl of Lisburne (until 6 January); Thomas Johnes (from 4 July)
Lord Lieutenant of Carmarthenshire – John Vaughan  
Lord Lieutenant of Denbighshire – Sir Watkin Williams-Wynn, 5th Baronet    
Lord Lieutenant of Flintshire – Robert Grosvenor, 1st Marquess of Westminster 
Lord Lieutenant of Glamorgan – John Stuart, 1st Marquess of Bute 
Lord Lieutenant of Merionethshire - Sir Watkin Williams-Wynn, 5th Baronet
Lord Lieutenant of Montgomeryshire – George Herbert, 2nd Earl of Powis
Lord Lieutenant of Pembrokeshire – Richard Philipps, 1st Baron Milford
Lord Lieutenant of Radnorshire – Thomas Harley

Bishop of Bangor – John Warren (until 27 January); William Cleaver (from 24 May)
Bishop of Llandaff – Richard Watson
Bishop of St Asaph – Lewis Bagot
Bishop of St Davids – William Stuart (until October); Lord George Murray (nominated)

Events
February - John Bryan begins preaching.
5 May - Missionary John Davies sets out for Tahiti.
1 August - The Naval Temple on The Kymin at Monmouth is dedicated.
August - Owen Davies and John Hughes arrive in Ruthin to superintend the Wesleyan Methodist mission to Wales.
December - The Brecon Canal opens between Brecon and Talybont.
unknown dates
Richard Fothergill goes into partnership with Samuel Homfray at Tredegar.  Jeremiah Homfray begins leasing mineral lands at Abernant, Cwmbach, and Rhigos.
Edward Charles becomes official "bard" of the Gwyneddigion Society.
Thomas Charles introduces the practice of allowing Calvinistic Methodist congregations to elect their own elders.
Richard Ellis succeeds his father, Lewis Ellis, as organist of Beaumaris Church.
William Jones establishes a grammar school at Wrexham.
William Nott joins the Bengal European Regiment in India.

Arts and literature

New books
William Bingley - Tour round North Wales
John Evans - A Tour through part of North Wales in … 1798 and at other times
John Jones - A Development of … Events calculated to restore the Christian Religion to its … Purity
Thomas Jones - A Cardiganshire Landlord's Advice to his Tenants
Richard Llwyd - Beaumaris Bay
William Ouseley - Epitome of the Ancient History of Persia
Henry Wigstead - Remarks on a Tour to North and South Wales: In the Year 1797

Music
"Suo Gân" (approximate first printing)

Births
4 March - Dr William Price, physician (d. 1893)
6 March - Samuel Roberts (S.R.), Radical leader (d. 1885)
22 March - Thomas Bevan, Archdeacon of St David's (d. 1863)
20 June - Edward Douglas-Pennant, 1st Baron Penrhyn (d. 1886)
1 August - Elizabeth Randles, musical prodigy (d. 1829)
1 October - Williams Evans, hymnist (d. 1880)
30 October - Ernest Vaughan, 4th Earl of Lisburne, landowner and politician (d. 1873) 
29 November - David Griffith (Clwydfardd), poet and archdruid (d. 1894)
date unknown 
James James (Iago Emlyn), minister and poet (d. 1879)
David Morris, politician (d. 1864)

Deaths
6 January 
William Jones of Neyland, clergyman and author, 73
Wilmot Vaughan, 1st Earl of Lisburne, politician, 71
27 January - John Warren, Bishop of St David's and later of Bangor
14 March - Daines Barrington, antiquary and naturalist, 72
May - Evan Hughes (Hughes Fawr), clergyman and author
14 July - Basil Feilding, 6th Earl of Denbigh, 81

References

 
 Wales